Jalaun is a Lok Sabha parliamentary constituency in Jalaun district, South-Western Uttar Pradesh, India.

The serial number of this constituency in Uttar Pradesh, is 58. This constituency is reserved for Scheduled caste candidates.

In the 2004 Lok Sabha Elections, 44.25% of eligible voters exercised their franchise.

Assembly segments

Members of Parliament

Election results

Election results 2019

Election results 2014

See also
 Jalaun
 List of Constituencies of the Lok Sabha

Notes

References

45

Lok Sabha constituencies in Uttar Pradesh
Jalaun district